The Port of Liège is a Belgian inland port in Liège in the Province of Liège in Wallonia at the Meuse river and at the Albert Canal in the heart of Europe. Liège is the third largest inland port in Europe after Duisburg and Paris. It also has direct links to Antwerp and Rotterdam via its canals. Stretching over a distance of 26 kilometers and comprising 32 port areas, it covers 3.7 square kilometers.

References

Ports and harbours of Belgium